George Ott (born 22 October 2001) is a New Zealand professional footballer who plays for NPL Victoria club Melbourne Knights as a striker.

Club career
He made his professional debut on 5 January 2022 in a FFA Cup match against A-League Men side Melbourne City FC.

Ott made his A-League Men debut on 18 March 2022 in a 4–0 away loss against Newcastle Jets. Fellow Wellington Phoenix Academy graduate Jackson Manuel also made his debut in the same match.

References

External links

Living people
New Zealand association footballers
Association football forwards
Wellington Phoenix FC players
2001 births